Qualification for the 2009 Little League World Series took place in eight United States regions and eight international regions from June through August 2009.

United States

Great Lakes

Mid-Atlantic

Midwest

Note: The Dakotas are organized into a single Little League district.

New England

Northwest

Southeast

Southwest

West

International

Asia-Pacific

Canada

Caribbean

Europe

Japan

Latin America

Mexico

Phase 1

Phase 2

Middle East-Africa

References

External links
Littleleague.org

2009 Little League World Series